Shadowlands is the forty-first album by Klaus Schulze. Taking in consideration the previously released multi-disc box sets (Silver Edition, Historic Edition, Jubilee Edition, Contemporary Works I, and Contemporary Works II), it could be viewed as Schulze's one hundred and second album. This is Klaus Schulze's first solo studio album since 2007's Kontinuum. Shadowlands was released on 22 February 2013 in two editions, with the limited edition (limited to 3,000 copies) containing an additional CD with two bonus tracks.

Track listing

Disc 1

Disc 2

Personnel
 Klaus Schulze – electronics
 Lisa Gerrard – vocals
 Chrysta Bell – vocals
 Julia Messenger – vocals
 Thomas Kagermann – violin, flute, vocals

External links
 Shadowlands at the official site of Klaus Schulze

References

Klaus Schulze albums
2013 albums